The 2006 Netball Superleague Grand Final featured Team Bath and Galleria Mavericks. Team Bath won the inaugural Netball Superleague title with a 43–35 win over Mavericks. Joanne Binns was prominent in both attack and defence as Team Bath fought back after going behind by three goals early on. 
The introduction Lynsey Armitage saw Mavericks launch a fightback but it was not enough. Rachel Dunn was top scorer for Team Bath with 29 goals.

Route to the Final

Match summary

Teams

References

2005–06 Netball Superleague season
2005-06
Team Bath (netball) matches
Mavericks Netball matches
Netball Superleague